is a Japanese football player who plays for Kataller Toyama.

Club statistics
Updated to 23 February 2020.

References

External links

Profile at Ventforet Kofu

1986 births
Living people
Association football people from Fukuoka Prefecture
People from Yame, Fukuoka
Japanese footballers
J1 League players
J2 League players
J3 League players
Avispa Fukuoka players
JEF United Chiba players
Ventforet Kofu players
Kataller Toyama players
Association football midfielders